The House of Nesselrode is an ancient German noble family originating in the Duchy of Berg. Over the centuries, the family expanded their possessions through marriage with the most powerful families of the region.

History
The family was first recorded in September 1303 when its progenitor knight Heinrich genannt Flecke von Nesselrode was mentioned as feudal lord of Deutz Abbey.  served as their first family seat. There were several branches of the family: Nesselrode-Reichenstein, Nesselrode-Ehreshoven, Nesselrode-Landscron, and Nesselrode-Hugenpoēt. They were sovereign Counts of the imperially immediate .

Nesselrode-Reichenstein line 
The Reichenstein line were made Imperial barons in 1653 and Imperial Counts in 1702. In 1698, Baron Franz von Nesselrode-Reichenstein (1635–1707), from 1702 Imperial Count, who served as Imperial Chancellor in the Principality of Münster, bought the immediate Lordship of Reichenstein from the Counts von Wied for 6000 thaler. He was followed by his son, Count Franz Wilhelm Anton von Nesselrode-Reichenstein (1701–1776). With his death, this line of the family became extinct. The County of Reichenstein was inherited by his cousin, Count Johann Wilhelm Maximilian von Nesselrode-Landscron (1726–1800), who became the reigning Count von Nesselrode-Reichenstein.

Nesselrode-Landscron line
The Nesselrode-Landscron line were made Imperial barons in 1652 and Imperial counts in 1710. Baron Johann Salentin Wilhelm von Nesselrode und Rhade (died in 1715), who served as Imperial Oberstleutnant, was made Imperial Count von Nesselrode-Landscron by Joseph I, Holy Roman Emperor, in 1710. His son, Count Johann Franz von Nesselrode-Landscron (1671–1751), served as Imperial Generalfeldzeugmeister. His son, Count Johann Wilhelm Maximilian von Nesselrode-Landscron und Grimberg (1726–1800), married to Countess Maria Theresia von Auersperg (1729–1803), inherited the Lordship of Reichenstein and became the reigning Count. He was followed by his son, Johann Franz Joseph von Nesselrode-Reichenstein (1755–1824). Due to the dissolution of the Holy Roman Empire, their immediate possessions were mediatized to Nassau, in 1806. This mediatized branch of the family became extinct in 1824. Their possessions were inherited by the Counts Droste zu Vischering, who incorporated the Nesselrode coat of arms into their own, as the heir of the last reigning Count, Johann Franz Joseph, was his eldest surviving daughter, Countess Maria Karoline Theresia Josepha von Nesselrode-Reichenstein, who became Countess Droste zu Vischering (1779–1858).

Nesselrode-Ehreshoven line

The Nesselrode-Ehreshoven line were made Imperial barons in 1653 and Imperial Counts in 1710. Some members of the Nesselrode-Ehreshoven branch settled in Russian Empire, in the 18th century, where they held prominent positions and became incorporated into the Russian nobility. Count Wilhelm Karl von Nesselrode-Ehreshoven (1724–1810) served as the Ambassador of Catherine the Great to Portugal. His son, Count Karl Robert von Nesselrode-Ehreshoven (1780–1862), served as Russian Minister of Foreign Affairs from 1814 to 1856, while his son, Count Dimitri von Nesselrode-Ehreshoven (1816–1906), served in the  Russian State Duma and held the position of Oberhofmeister at Imperial Court of Russia.

Nesselrode-Hugenpoēt line
Carl-Theodor, Baron von Nesselrode-Hugenpoēt, served as a major in the Bavarian army. His brother, Baron Maximilian von Nesselrode-Hugenpoēt, who later became a Generalmajor, was confirmed as a baron on 22 August 1814, in the Kingdom of Bavaria. The title of Baron in Bavaria was also confirmed in 1822 to Baron Carl Anselm Franz von Nesselrode-Hugenpoēt, who served as Bavarian Hauptmann.

Former properties of the Counts of Nesselrode

Notable members 
Notable persons with that name include:

 Karl von Nesselrode-Ehreshoven (1780–1862), Russian foreign minister
 Maria von Nesselrode (1822–1874), Polish pianist
 Maria von Nesselrode (1786–1849), Russian court lady

See also 
 Mount Nesselrode

German-language surnames